Hamilton Academical Football Club, often known as Hamilton Accies, or The Accies, is a Scottish football club from Hamilton, South Lanarkshire who currently compete in the Scottish Championship, having been relegated from the 2020–21 Scottish Premiership. They were established in 1874 from the school football team at Hamilton Academy and remain the only professional club in British football to have originated from a school team. Hamilton have won the Scottish Challenge Cup twice and have finished runners-up in the Scottish Cup twice. The club currently play their home games at New Douglas Park.

Club history

Hamilton Academical F.C. was formed in late 1874 by the rector and pupils of Hamilton Academy. The club soon became members of the Scottish Football Association and initially began competing in the Scottish Cup and Qualifying Cup, before joining the Scottish Football League in November 1897 following the resignation of Renton.

In the 1970s, Hamilton briefly resigned from the league due to mounting debts. In 1994 the club sold its home ground, Douglas Park, to Sainsbury's supermarket, and subsequently ground-shared in Coatbridge and Glasgow for seven years. During this period the club went through financial hardships and unpaid players went on strike. As a result, Hamilton was unable to fulfil one fixture during the 1999–2000 season and were docked 15 points, the result of which was relegation to the Third Division. The club moved into its New Douglas Park stadium in 2001.

In 2008, for the first time in 20 years, Accies gained promotion to the top division of Scottish football, the Scottish Premier League. In the 2009–10 season, a 3–0 victory against Kilmarnock on 17 April 2010 secured a third straight season in Scotland's top flight with four games remaining.

The Accies' stay in the SPL ended in the 2010–11 season, when they were relegated after a 1–0 defeat away to St Johnstone. Despite their relegation, Hamilton's time in the top flight was most notable for their emphasis on youth, including midfielders James McCarthy and James McArthur, both of whom went on to play for English club Wigan Athletic in the Premier League before gaining international recognition.

Return to the Premiership

After a hard-fought campaign during the 2013–14 Scottish Championship season, Accies finished in second position on the final day of the season following a 10–2 home victory over Morton. Despite the disappointment of missing out on automatic promotion to Dundee, they went on to defeat Falkirk 2–1 on aggregate in the first stage of their Premiership play-off to face top-flight Hibernian over two legs for a place in the 2014–15 Scottish Premiership. Hamilton lost the first leg 2–0 at New Douglas Park, but two away goals in the return leg at Easter Road, including an injury time strike, forced the tie to extra time and penalty-kicks. Hamilton converted all of their spot-kicks and gained promotion back to the top flight. Manager Alex Neil left the club in January 2015, to take up a position at English club Norwich.

Hamilton found themselves in another playoff at the end of 2016–17, this time as the Premiership incumbents. A close tie against Championship representatives Dundee United ended in a 1–0 aggregate victory, with Accies youth graduate Greg Docherty scoring the only goal.

2017 fraud incident
In October 2017, an elaborate voice phishing fraud was perpetrated on Hamilton Academical. Posing as a fraud investigator for the club's bank (Royal Bank of Scotland), the culprit convinced the club's account handler that funds were at risk from corruption within the company and should be moved temporarily, providing instructions to evade suspicion in the bank's genuine checks when monies began to be transferred. The account handler also spoke to an accomplice via a telephone number provided by the main culprit to 'confirm' the legitimacy of the instructions. With the employee sufficiently deceived, a total of close to £1 million was transferred out of the club's accounts over several transactions, with the fraud being discovered the following day. The incident involved most of the club's working funds, causing the abandonment of a project to improve the youth academy.

In February 2018, having only been able to recover a small percentage of their funds, Hamilton publicly declared that they were preparing to take legal action against the bank for a portion of the loss, believing the bank's security measures to have been inadequate in detecting the fraud (due to the unusual pattern of the transactions and the large sums involved); RBS refuted this but stated they were working with the club and the police to identify those responsible. The Accies chief executive Colin McGowan later described RBS as "morally bankrupt" after he was informed during discussions to prevent future losses that the bank's system did not allow customers to set daily transfer limits.

Stadium
The club play their fixtures at New Douglas Park, which was opened in 2001. The pitch is an artificial surface. The stadium has an overall capacity of 6,018 and is composed of two permanent and one temporary stand.

The ground replaced Douglas Park, which was the home of Hamilton from 1888 to 1994. The ground was opened on 30 May 1888 with a match against Glasgow University. It was eventually sold to supermarket chain Sainsbury's in 1994, with the proceeds going towards the construction of the new stadium, which lies adjacent to the site of Douglas Park.

Between 1994 and 2001 the club had no home. They ground-shared at Cliftonhill and Firhill Stadium.

Honours

 Scottish First Division
 Winners: 1985–86, 1987–88, 2007–08
 Runners-up:  2013–14 (second tier)
  Scottish Second Division
 Winners: 1903–04
 Runners-up: 1952–53 (second tier), 1964–65 (second tier), 1996–97 (third tier), 2003–04 (third tier)
 Scottish Third Division
 Winners: 2000–01
 Scottish Cup
 Runners-up: 1910–11, 1934–35
 Scottish Challenge Cup
 Winners: 1991–92, 1992–93
 Runners-up: 2005–06, 2011–12

Club records

Match records
 Record victory: 10–2 vs. Cowdenbeath (October 1932) and 10–2 vs. Morton (May 2014)

Transfer records
 Biggest transfer purchase: Tomas Cerny from Sigma Olomouc (July 2009; £180,000)
 Biggest transfer sale: James McCarthy to Wigan Athletic (July 2009; £1,200,000)

Players

Current squad

On loan

Player of the Year

Captains

The following is a list of the officially appointed captains of the Hamilton Academical first-team.

Former players

Coaching staff

Managers

References

External links

 
Club History  at Hamilton Academical Memory Bank

 
Football clubs in Scotland
Association football clubs established in 1874
Football in South Lanarkshire
Hamilton, South Lanarkshire
1874 establishments in Scotland
Scottish Premier League teams
Scottish Football League teams
Scottish Challenge Cup winners
Scottish Professional Football League teams